The Diocese of Morogoro may refer to;

Anglican Diocese of Morogoro, in Tanzania
Roman Catholic Diocese of Morogoro, in Tanzania
Lutheran Diocese of Morogoro, in Tanzania